The Man Who Made Diamonds is a 1937 British crime film directed by Ralph Ince and starring Noel Madison, James Stephenson and Lesley Brook.

Plot summary
A professor invents a way of manufacturing diamonds.

Cast
 Noel Madison ...  Joseph
 James Stephenson ...  Ben
 Lesley Brook ...  Helen Calthrop
 Wilfrid Lawson ...  Gallanie
 George Galleon ...  Tony
 Renee Gadd ...  Marianne
 Philip Ray ...  Tompkins
 Hector Abbas ...  Nichols
 J. Fisher White ...  Prof. Calthrop

References

External links

1937 films
1937 crime films
1930s English-language films
Films directed by Ralph Ince
British black-and-white films
British crime films
1930s British films